Sangre de Cristo (Spanish: "blood of Christ") can refer to:

Sangre de Cristo Mountains, in Northern New Mexico and South-Central Colorado in the United States
 Sangre de Cristo Pass, a mountain pass in the Sangre de Cristo Mountains.
 Sangre de Cristo Creek, in Costilla County, Colorado
Sangre de Cristo Range, the northernmost portion of the Sangre de Cristo Mountains, located entirely in Colorado
 Sangre de Cristo Wilderness, a long and narrow wilderness area of the Sangre de Cristo Range centered about Saguache and Custer counties, Colorado.
Sangre de cristo, a spicier variant of the Michelada beer cocktail
 Sangre de Cristo Seminary and School for Biblical Studies was incorporated in 1976 as a non-profit organization. 
 Sangre de Cristo Formation, a geologic formation in Colorado.
 Sangre de Cristo Ranches, Colorado, an unincorporated community located near Fort Garland in Costilla County, Colorado 
 Sangre de Cristo National Heritage Area, in Colorado

See also 
 Sangre (disambiguation)